This is a list of notable people who are from Prince Edward Island, Canada, or have spent a large part or formative part of their career in that province.

A
Milton Acorn, poet
Angèle Arsenault, singer, songwriter and media host

B
Leone Bagnall, politician
Francis Bain, author, scientist, farmer
Carolyn Bertram, politician
Paula Biggar, politician
Lorne Bonnell, politician
Billy Bridges, Olympic para-athlete
Betty Jean Brown, politician

C
Catherine Callbeck, politician
Dave Cameron, ice hockey coach
Alex Campbell, politician
Urban Carmichael, storyteller and poet
George Coles, politician
Jared Connaughton, Olympic sprinter
Rose Cousins, musician
Josh Currie, hockey player

D
Tanya Davis, musician and poet
Noah Dobson, hockey player
Lloyd Duffy, jockey
Mike Duffy, journalist and politician
Gordie Dwyer, hockey player and coach

F
 Peter W. Forbes (born 1850), member of the California state legislature

G
Gerard Gallant, ice hockey player and coach
Grant Macdonald, singer-songwriter
Lennie Gallant, singer-songwriter
Millie Gamble, photographer
Joe Ghiz, politician
Robert Ghiz, politician
George Godfrey, boxer
Jenn Grant, singer-songwriter
Dylan Mohan Gray, filmmaker/documentarian

H
Vern Handrahan, baseball player
Francis Longworth Haszard, politician, jurist
Wally Hennessey, Harness racing driver
Libbe Hubley, politician
Hangman Hughes, wrestler

J 

 Ross Johnston, hockey player

K
Lorie Kane, golfer
Francis Clement Kelley, second Roman Catholic Bishop of Oklahoma City
Forbes Kennedy, former ice hockey player
Michael Kennedy, film and television director
Joey Kitson, singer

L
David Laird, framer of the Indian Act and first resident Lieutenant Governor of the Northwest Territories
Daniel Ledwell, musician

M
Amber MacArthur, broadcasting personality and author
Zack MacEwen, hockey player
Martha MacIsaac, actress
Tara MacLean, singer-songwriter
Catherine MacLellan, singer-songwriter
Gene MacLellan, musician
Alexander Wallace Matheson, politician
John Alexander Mathieson, educator, politician, jurist
David MacEachern, Olympic gold medallist and world champion in bobsledding
Lucy Maud Montgomery, writer
Adam McQuaid, hockey player
Scott Morrison, basketball coach
Heather Moyse, two-time Olympic gold medallist in bobsledding

O
Joe O'Brien, Harness racing driver.
Steve Ott, ice hockey player
Lemuel Cambridge Owen, shipbuilder, banker and former premier

P
Edward Palmer, lawyer, politician
James Colledge Pope, businessman, former premier
William Henry Pope, land agent, lawyer, jurist

R
Claire Rankin, actress
Brad Richards, former ice hockey player
James Jeffrey Roche, poet and diplomat
Whitney Rose, country musician

S
Jacob Gould Schurman, educator and diplomat
Gail Shea, politician
Michael Smith, chef and television host
Kent Stetson, writer
Mark Strand, poet

T
Jackie Torrens, actress
Jonathan Torrens, actor
Wes Trainor, hockey player
Al Tuck, musician

W
Alexander Bannerman Warburton, former premier
Nathan Wiley, musician
George Wood, professional baseball player

Y
James Yeo, politician
John Yeo, politician
Johnny Young, politician
Ross Young, politician